Beitar Givat Ze'ev is an Israeli football club based in Givat Ze'ev. The club currently plays in Liga Bet South B division.

History
The club was founded in 1999 and registered to play in Liga Gimel. The club was promoted to Liga Bet at the end of the following season, and was further promoted at the end of the 2002–03 season as the club won its division, staying in Liga Alef for three seasons before dropping back to Liga Bet, with a further relegation following in 2011. However, the club bounced back as it finished as runners-up in its division and was promoted back to Liga Bet.

Honours

League

Cups

References

External links
Beitar Givat Ze'ev Shabi The Israel Football Association 

Givat Ze'ev
Givat Ze'ev
Association football clubs established in 1999
1999 establishments in Israel